Keratocan (KTN) also known as keratan sulfate proteoglycan keratocan, is a protein that in humans is encoded by the KERA gene.

Keratan sulfate proteoglycans (KSPGs) are members of the small leucine-rich proteoglycan (SLRP) family. KSPGs, particularly keratocan, lumican and mimecan, are important to the transparency of the cornea.

Mutations of the gene cause cornea plana 2.

References

Further reading